"Rain" is a song by Irish rock band The Script. It was written by James Barry, Camille Purcell, Mark Sheehan and Danny O'Donoghue, with the latter two and Andrew Frampton, Jimbo Wallace, Max Farrar handling the song's production. The song was released on 14 July 2017, through Sony Music, as the lead single from the band's fifth studio album Freedom Child.

Background
The Script described the track as a "feel-good summer tune". "After a very long process of making 'Album 5', the song 'Rain' came right at the end. It's a summer song so we thought, only The Script can make it 'Rain in Summer'" the band stated. In an interview with Metro, the band regarded the single as a progression. "I think we have afforded ourselves a little bit of leeway. The past four records have been not the same sound but we've been progressing at a slow rate. It's been two years since we had something out so there's two years worth of progression in our music. I'm sure to a lot of people it might sound quite drastic at first but if they heard the 60 songs we've put out you'd hear a slower progression." When asked if their change in sound was deliberate, they said:"When we started this record we wanted to do something where people would hear a song and go 'oh I love that song!' and then look it up and find it's us. We wanted to change our sound a push our sound a bit. It's either adapt, change or die in this industry. It's very difficult in this industry. We wanted to revamp and reboot the sound and at the end of the day we're still the same songwriters and that's never going to go away."The band said that they always "want something different in our lives" and "hoping our songs penetrate different markets and gain new fans", They referred themselves as an ambitious band. "With Rain we just decided we needed something a bit lighter, you can't just walk into a party of people and start with a heavy topic. It's nice to have a bit of escapism that people can bob their head to and not be so serious about but when people peel the layers of the song they realise that lyrically we've gone deep but on the surface we wanted people to have a bit of fun."

Credits and personnel
Credits adapted from Tidal.

 Mark Sheehan – composing, lyrics, producing
 James "Jimbo" Barry – composing, lyrics, producing, bass guitar, drums, guitar, programming
 Camille Purcell – composing, lyrics, background vocals
 Danny O'Donoghue – composing, lyrics, producing
 Andrew Frampton – producing, keyboard, programming, vocal producing
 Max Farrar – producing, keyboard, programming
 Manny Marroquin – mixing engineering
 Michelle Mancini – mastering engineering
 Filippo Barbieri – engineering
 Chris Galland – engineering
 Robin Florent – assistant engineering
 Scott Desmarais – assistant engineering

Charts

Weekly charts

Year-end charts

Certifications

References

The Script songs
2017 singles
2017 songs
Songs about weather
Songs written by Danny O'Donoghue
Songs written by Mark Sheehan
Songs written by Kamille (musician)